PC12 may refer to:

 PC12 cell line
 PC12 minicomputer
 Pilatus PC-12, a civilian aircraft
 BAP Río Chira (PC 12), a vessel of the Peruvian Coast Guard